Hamshire may refer to:

 Hamshire, Texas, an unincorporated community in Jefferson County
 Hampshire, a county on the southern coast of England